The discography of the South Korean boy group Wanna One, an 11-member band formed through the 'survival' competition Produce 101 Season 2 in 2017 and was under Korean entertainment company Stone Music Entertainment.

The group's debut release was the EP 1X1=1 (To Be One), which was released on August 7, 2017.

Studio albums

Extended plays

Singles

Other charted songs

Music videos

Notes

References

External links
 

Discography
Discographies of South Korean artists
K-pop music group discographies